The following is a list of notable deaths in April 2017.

Entries for each day are listed alphabetically by surname. A typical entry lists information in the following sequence:
 Name, age, country of citizenship at birth, subsequent country of citizenship (if applicable), reason for notability, cause of death (if known), and reference.

April 2017

1
Talaat al-Shayeb, 74, Egyptian author, translator and intellectual.
Sharon Ambrose, 77, American politician, member of the Council of the District of Columbia (1997–2007).
Alberto Assirelli, 80, Italian cyclist.
Gary Austin, 75, American theatre writer and director (The Groundlings), lung cancer.
Parv Bancil, 50, British playwright.
Lonnie Brooks, 83, American blues guitarist and singer.
Antonio Ciliberti, 82, Italian Roman Catholic prelate, Bishop of Locri-Gerace (1988–1993), Archbishop of Matera-Irsina (1993–2003) and Catanzaro-Squillace (2003–2011).
Bob Cunningham, 82, American jazz bassist.
Gösta Ekman, 77, Swedish actor and director (Jönssonligan, Martin Beck).
Nelson Elliott, 91, Canadian politician.
Darcus Howe, 74, Trinidadian-born British civil rights activist, member of the Mangrove Nine.
Ikutaro Kakehashi, 87, Japanese engineer and entrepreneur, founder of Ace Tone and Roland Corporation.
*Kim Jong-gil, 90, South Korean poet.
Frederick Bernard Lacey, 96, American jurist, U.S. Attorney (1969–1971) and judge for the District Court for the District of New Jersey (1971–1986).
Antonio Lamela, 90, Spanish architect (Torres de Colón, Santiago Bernabéu Stadium, Adolfo Suárez Madrid–Barajas Airport).
Sir Peter Lawler, 96, Australian public servant and diplomat, Secretary of the Department of Administrative Services (1975–1983), Ambassador to the Holy See and Ireland.
Stuart Markland, 69, Scottish footballer (Berwick Rangers, Dundee United, Montrose).
Wycliffe Noble, 91, British architect and musician (The Joystrings).
Ray Pelfrey, 89, American football player (Green Bay Packers), complications from hip surgery.
William Pinch, 76, American mineralogist.
Louis Sarno, 62, American musicologist and author, liver disease.
Burton Watson, 91, American translator.
Yevgeny Yevtushenko, 84, Russian poet (Babi Yar).

2
Sam Ard, 78, American racecar driver.
Stan Beal, 92, Australian football player.
Vivienne de Silva Boralessa, 86, Sri Lankan singer.
Ken Donnelly, 66, American politician, member of the Massachusetts State Senate (since 2009), complications from a brain tumor.
André Drouin, 70, Canadian politician, cancer.
Alma Delia Fuentes, 80, Mexican actress.
Hate Man, 80, American writer, heart failure.
Ravi Jayewardene, 80, Sri Lankan army officer and Olympic sports shooter (1964).
Rhubarb Jones, 65, American country disc jockey and professional wrestling ring announcer (WCW), heart attack.
Leonard Litwin, 102, American real estate developer.
Rafael Molina Morillo, 87, Dominican newspaper editor and diplomat.
Konrad Repgen, 93, German historian.
Michèle Rosier, 86, French fashion designer, film director, documentary maker and screenwriter.
Julio Rotemberg, 63, Argentine-born American economist, cancer.
Gerard Washnitzer, 90, American mathematician.
D. B. H. Wildish, 102, British Royal Navy vice admiral.
Jeremy Wilson, 72, British editor, publisher and writer.

3
Kishori Amonkar, 84, Indian classical singer.
Michel Arrivé, 80, French linguist and novelist.
Bruno Burrini, 85, Italian Olympic alpine skier.
John Chrispinsson, 60, Swedish journalist, heart attack.
John Cockburn, 79, British test pilot.
Azim Daudpota, 83, Pakistani military officer and politician, Commander of the Air Force of Zimbabwe (1983–1986), Governor of Sindh (1999–2000).
Abraham S. Fischler, 89, American academic, President of Nova Southeastern University (1970–1992).
Davuldena Gnanissara Thero, 101, Sri Lankan Buddhist monk, Supreme Mahanayaka of Amarapura Nikaya.
Sergio González Rodríguez, 67, Mexican journalist, heart attack.
Leif Klette, 89, Norwegian Olympic fencer (1952, 1960).
John T. Knox, 92, American politician, member of the California State Assembly (1960–1980).
Denis Mahony, 88, Irish Gaelic footballer (Dublin).
Tomairangi Paki, 64, New Zealand Māori kapa haka leader.
Bruce Palmer, 81, New Zealand lawyer and jurist.
Enrico Quarantelli, 92, American sociologist.
Kathleen Ridder, 94, American philanthropist, educator, writer, and equality for women activist.
Roy Sievers, 90, American baseball player (St. Louis Browns, Washington Senators, Chicago White Sox).
Thomas Tackaberry, 93, American military officer.
Gary W. Thomas, 79, American judge.
Bill Tinnock, 86, New Zealand Olympic rower (1952), British Empire Games silver medalist (1950, 1954).
Stella Turk, 92, British zoologist, naturalist, and conservationist.
Eva von Gamm, 84, German figure skater.
William Walaska, 71, American politician, member of the Rhode Island Senate (1995–2017), cancer.

4
Tobias Barry, 92, American politician, member of the Illinois House of Representatives (1960–1974).
Samir Farid, 73, Egyptian film critic.
Clóvis Frainer, 86, Brazilian Roman Catholic prelate, Archbishop of Manaus (1985–1991) and Juiz de Fora (1991–2001).
George Mostow, 93, American mathematician.
Mária Pozsonec, 77, Slovenian politician, MP (1990–2008).
Raymond Reisser, 85, French racing cyclist.
Giovanni Sartori, 92, Italian political scientist and journalist (Corriere della Sera), throat cancer.
Frank Schepke, 81, German rower, Olympic champion (1960).
Karl Stotz, 90, Austrian football player and manager.
Fernand Tardy, 97, French soldier, politician, and author.
Mike Taylor, 82, British racing driver, cancer.

5
Attilio Benfatto, 74, Italian bicycle racer, world championship bronze medalist (1966).
Arthur Bisguier, 87, American chess grandmaster and writer, respiratory failure.
John Chittick, 69, American HIV/AIDS activist.
Paul G. Comba, 91, Italian-American computer scientist and astronomer.
Walter de Camp, 70, Finnish writer.
David Gove, 38, American ice hockey player (Carolina Hurricanes) and coach (Wheeling Nailers), heroin overdose.
Huang Yi, 65, Hong Kong author, stroke.
Ryo Kagawa, 69, Japanese folk singer, leukemia.
Margaret Kenyatta, 89, Kenyan politician and diplomat, mayor of Nairobi (1970–1976).
Alma Soller McLay, 97, American stenographer (Nuremberg trials).
Bernard Millant, 87, French bow maker, archetier and luthier.
Hans Heinz Moser, 80, Swiss actor (Grounding).
Paul O'Neill, 61, American producer, composer and songwriter (Savatage, Trans-Siberian Orchestra), prescription medication reaction.
Makoto Ōoka, 86, Japanese poet and literary critic.
María Luisa Ozaita, 77, Spanish composer.
Tim Parnell, 84, British racing driver (Formula One).
Memè Perlini, 69, Italian actor and director (A Fistful of Dynamite, The Grand Duel), suicide by defenestration.
Steve Sandor, 79, American actor (Fire and Ice, Stryker, Star Trek).
Atanase Sciotnic, 75, Romanian sprint canoeist, Olympic silver medalist (1972).
Ameer Bux Shar, 56, Pakistani author.
Dennis Shaw, 86, English cricketer (Warwickshire).
Ilkka Sinisalo, 58, Finnish ice hockey player (Philadelphia Flyers, HIFK, Los Angeles Kings), prostate cancer.
George Snyder, 88, American politician, member of the Maryland Senate (1959–1974).
Helen Szamuely, 66, Russian-born British political activist.

6
Stan Anslow, 85, English footballer (Millwall).
Frank Attkisson, 61, American politician, member of the Florida House of Representatives (2000–2008), Mayor of Kissimmee, Florida (1996–2000), traffic collision.
Gordon Carton, 95, Canadian politician, Ontario MPP (1963–1975).
Bob Cerv, 91, American baseball player (New York Yankees, Kansas City Athletics).
John Fraser, 82, British politician, MP (1966–1997).
Ronald Gatski, 82, American politician.
Armand Gatti, 93, Monégasque-born French playwright, poet and journalist.
Libuše Havelková, 92, Czech actress (Closely Watched Trains) and educator, Vice-Dean of Faculty of Theatre in Prague.
Newton Holanda Gurgel, 93, Brazilian Roman Catholic prelate, Bishop of Crato (1993–2001).
Imperial Commander, 16, Irish racehorse, heart attack.
Michael McPartland, 77, British Roman Catholic priest.
Bona Medeiros, 86, Brazilian politician, Governor of Piauí (1986–1987).
Hugh Montgomery, 93, American intelligence officer.
David Peel, 73, American singer and political activist, complications from a heart attack.
Jack Pinoteau, 93, French film director.
Don Rickles, 90, American comedian and actor (Toy Story, Casino, Kelly's Heroes), kidney failure.
Rolf Sagen, 76, Norwegian author.
Peter Savaryn, 90, Ukrainian-born Canadian lawyer.
Clyde See, 75, American politician, member of the West Virginia House of Delegates (1974–1984).
Jerzy Vetulani, 81, Polish neuroscientist.

7
Alicia Agut, 87, Spanish actress, respiratory complications.
Robert B. Baldwin, 93, American vice admiral.
Joan Baker, 94, British painter.
Relja Bašić, 87, Croatian actor (One Song a Day Takes Mischief Away).
Arturo García Bustos, 90, Mexican painter.
Sir Andy Chande, 88, Tanzanian executive and Freemason.
Walter DeVerter, 81, American politician.
Bill DuBois Sr., 100, American farmer and lobbyist.
S. M. Ganapathy, 85, Indian temple architect and sculptor.
John Glick, 78, American pottery artist.
Marthe Gosteli, 99, Swiss women's rights activist, complications from a fall.
Ray Guillery, 87, German-born British neuroscientist.
Peter Isaacson, 96, Australian media publisher.
Derrick Jensen, 60, American football player (Oakland Raiders), Super Bowl Champion (1980, 1983), amyotrophic lateral sclerosis.
Robin Kay, 97, New Zealand painter and historian.
Patricia McKissack, 72, American children's writer.
Christopher Morahan, 87, English stage and television director (The Jewel in the Crown).
Mary Mumford, 15th Lady Herries of Terregles, 76, Scottish peeress.
Glenn O'Brien, 70, American journalist and editor (Rolling Stone, Interview), complications from pneumonia.
Craig Payne, 55, American boxer.
Tim Pigott-Smith, 70, English actor (The Jewel in the Crown, Clash of the Titans, V for Vendetta).
John Salmon, 86, British advertising executive.
Ben Speer, 86, American musician (Speer Family).
Frans Widerberg, 82, Norwegian painter.

8
Alicia Appleman-Jurman, 86, Polish-born Israeli-American memoirist.
Stephen Caracappa, 75, American NYPD police detective and organized crime operative, cancer.
Fishman, 66, Mexican professional wrestler (UWA, AAA, EMLL), heart attack.
Georgy Grechko, 85, Russian cosmonaut, Hero of the Soviet Union, heart failure.
Eugene Lang, 98, American philanthropist.
Brian Matthew, 88, English TV and radio presenter (Saturday Club, Thank Your Lucky Stars, Sounds of the 60s).
Sir Douglas Myers, 78, New Zealand businessman (Lion Nathan), cancer.
Vasantha Obeysekera, 79, Sri Lankan filmmaker.
Rita Orlandi-Malaspina, 79, Italian opera singer.
Park Nam-ok, 94, South Korean film director.
David Perry, 79, English rugby union player.
Kim Plainfield, 63, American jazz drummer.
Mahmoodur Rahman, 75, Indian academic administrator, Vice-Chancellor of Aligarh Muslim University, cardiac arrest.
Donald Sarason, 84, American mathematician.
Anri Volokhonsky, 81, Russian poet.

9
Knut Borge, 67, Norwegian journalist and entertainer.
Carme Chacón, 46, Spanish politician, Minister of Housing (2007–2008) and Defence (2008–2011), heart illness.
John Clarke, 68, New Zealand satirist (Fred Dagg, The Games).
Jonny Forsström, 73, Swedish artist.
Richard Kenneth Fox, 91, American diplomat, United States Ambassador to Trinidad and Tobago (1977–1979).
Peter Hansen, 95, American actor (When Worlds Collide, General Hospital, Dragonfly).
Harry Huskey, 101, American computer scientist (ENIAC).
Margarita Isabel, 75, Mexican actress (Cronos), emphysema.
Kim Young-ae, 65, South Korean actress (The Attorney), pancreatic cancer.
Dieter Kottysch, 73, German light middleweight boxer, Olympic gold medalist (1972).
Édouard Le Jeune, 96, French Resistance member and senator.
Fouad Naffah, 92, Lebanese politician.
Peter Par Jiek, South Sudanese military officer, shot.
Jean Périmony, 86, French actor and theatre director.
Stan Robinson, 80, British jazz tenor saxophonist and flautist.
Giorgio Bàrberi Squarotti, 87, Italian literary critic.
Bill Sutherland, 82, Canadian ice hockey player (Philadelphia Flyers, St. Louis Blues, Winnipeg Jets).
Bob Wootton, 75, American country guitarist (Johnny Cash, Tennessee Three).
Jean Worthley, 92, American naturalist and television presenter (Hodgepodge Lodge).

10
Jack Ahearn, 92, Australian motorcycle road racer.
Givi Berikashvili, 83, Georgian actor, respiratory failure.
Al Besselink, 93, American professional golfer.
Arthur James Boucot, 92, American paleontologist.
Raymond Chang, 77, Hong Kong-born American chemist.
Bab Christensen, 89, Norwegian actress.
Sir Arnold Clark, 89, Scottish businessman (Arnold Clark Group).
Spike Dykes, 79, American football coach (Texas Tech Red Raiders), heart attack.
Blossom Elfman, 91, American novelist.
Jan Faiks, 71, American politician, member of the Alaska Senate (1983–1991) and president (1987–1989), brain cancer.
Fred Furniss, 94, British footballer (Sheffield United F.C.).
Michael Gannon, 89, American historian and academic.
Linda Hopkins, 92, American actress (Purlie, Me and Bessie) and singer ("Shake a Hand"), Tony winner (1972).
Dennis F. Kinlaw, 94, American academic, president of Asbury University (1968–81, 1986–91).
Kirill Kovaldzhi, 87, Russian author.
Vuk Kulenovic, 70, Yugoslavian-born American composer.
David Parry-Jones, 83, Welsh TV presenter and writer (BBC), Alzheimer's disease.
Larry Reisbig, 77, American football player (Washington State Cougars) and coach (Long Beach State 49ers).
Carlo Riva, 95, Italian motorboat designer.
Larry Sharpe, 66, American professional wrestler (NWA) and trainer, liver disease.
Margaret Towner, 96, British actress (Derek, Star Wars: Episode I – The Phantom Menace).

11
Michael Ballhaus, 81, German cinematographer (Goodfellas, Air Force One, Broadcast News).
Martin J. Beckmann, 92, German economist.
Frederick H. Borsch, 81, American Episcopal prelate, Bishop of Los Angeles (1988–2002), myelodysplastic syndrome.
Edward Francis, 86, Indian Roman Catholic prelate, Bishop of Sivagangai (1987–2005).
Samir Frangieh, 71, Lebanese politician, MP (2005–2009), cancer.
J. Geils, 71, American guitarist (The J. Geils Band).
José Ramón Gurruchaga Ezama, 86, Spanish-born Peruvian Roman Catholic prelate, Bishop of Huaraz (1987–1996) and Lurin (1996–2006).
Shantanu Kaiser, 62, Bangladeshi poet and essayist.
Dorothy Mengering, 95, American television personality (Late Night with David Letterman, Late Show with David Letterman).
Tom Modrak, 74, American sports executive (Philadelphia Eagles, Buffalo Bills), neurological disease.
Chaïm Nissim, 68, Israeli-born Swiss anti-nuclear activist and politician, assisted suicide.
Joyce Pipkin, 93, American football player.
Margit Schumann, 64, German luger, Olympic gold medalist (1976).
Toby Smith, 46, British keyboardist (Jamiroquai), cancer.
Mark Wainberg, 71, Canadian medical researcher, co-discoverer of lamivudine, asthma.

12
Sheila Abdus-Salaam, 65, American judge, member of the New York Court of Appeals (since 2013), suicide by drowning.
Ramesh Chandra Agarwal, 72, Indian newspaper publisher (Dainik Bhaskar), heart attack.
Jean Bernabé, 75, French writer.
Kathleen Cassello, 58, American operatic soprano.
Tom Coyne, 62, American Grammy award-winning music engineer (21, 1989, 25), multiple myeloma.
Akhilesh Das, 56, Indian politician and sporting executive, member of the Rajya Sabha (1996–2014), mayor of Lucknow (1993–1995), heart attack.
Angel Espinosa, 50, Cuban Olympic boxer (1992), world amateur champion (1986).
Tony Figueira, 57, Angolan-born Namibian photographer, multiple myeloma.
William Norman Grigg, 54, American author, journalist, and libertarian activist, heart attack.
Geoff Grover, 73, Australian footballer (Port Melbourne).
Mufti Abdul Hannan, Bangladeshi terrorist, execution by hanging.
Wayne Hardin, 91, American college football player (Pacific) and coach (Navy, Temple), stroke.
Peggy Hayama, 83, Japanese singer, pneumonia.
Toshio Matsumoto, 85, Japanese film director (Funeral Parade of Roses), intestinal obstruction.
Chimwala Munilall, 68, Guyanese cricketer.
Charlie Murphy, 57, American comedian, actor, and screenwriter (Chappelle's Show, Norbit, The Boondocks), leukemia.

13
Vic Barnhart, 94, American baseball player (Pittsburgh Pirates).
Zareh Baronian, 75, Armenian theologian and abbot.
K. S. Chandrasekharan, 96, Indian-Swiss mathematician.
José Miguel Class, 78, Puerto Rican singer.
Dennis Edwards Jr., 95, American judge (New York Supreme Court).
Fred Goldsmith, 84, Australian VFL footballer (South Melbourne).
Daniel Guice, 92, American politician, member of the Mississippi House of Representatives (1956–1960), mayor of Biloxi (1961–1973).
Roger Highfield, 95, English historian.
Nona Liddell, 89, British violinist.
Robert Marta, 73, American film camera operator (The Jerk, Poltergeist II: The Other Side, The Golden Child), President of the Society of Operating Cameramen.
David Mwiraria, 78, Kenyan politician, MP for North Imenti (1992–2007), Minister of Finance (2003–2006), bone cancer.
Eric Pringle, 81, British scriptwriter and author.
Vakhtang Rcheulishvili, 63, Georgian physicist, construction executive and politician, MP (1992–2003), cancer.
Georges Rol, 90, French Roman Catholic prelate, Bishop of Angouleme (1975–1993).
Dan Rooney, 84, American football executive and diplomat, Chairman of the Pittsburgh Steelers (since 2003), Ambassador to Ireland (2009–2012), member of the Hall of Fame (2000).
Jim Scott, 78, American politician, member of the Virginia House of Delegates (1991–2013), complications from Alzheimer's disease.
Norio Shioyama, 77, Japanese animation director (Inuyasha, Tiger Mask), fire.
Robert Taylor, 85, American computer scientist and internet pioneer, recipient of the National Medal of Technology and the Draper Prize, complications from Parkinson's disease.
Imre Tóth, 68, Hungarian Olympic boxer.
Ralph Votrian, 82, American actor.

14
Robert H. Abel, 75, American author.
Carol Cuffy-Dowlat, 59, Trinidadian politician and radio host, Senator (1995–2000).
John Thomas Curtin, 95, American jurist, member of the U.S. District Court for Western New York (1967–1989).
Martín Elías, 26, Colombian vallenato singer, traffic collision.
Henry Hillman, 98, American venture capitalist and philanthropist.
George William Jones, 79, British political scientist and author.
Bruce Langhorne, 78, American folk musician (Bob Dylan) and film scorer (The Hired Hand), inspiration for "Mr. Tambourine Man", complications from a stroke.
Bill Mitchell, 65, British theatre director, cancer.
Hein-Direck Neu, 73, German Olympic discus thrower (1968, 1972, 1976).
Hugh Pitts, 83, American football player.
Wilhelm Sachsenmaier, 90, Austrian Olympic sports shooter (1952, 1960).
Girish Chandra Saxena, 89, Indian politician, Governor of Jammu and Kashmir (1990–1993, 1998–2003).
James Smith, 97, Canadian politician, Commissioner of Yukon (1966–1976).
Patti Smith, 70, American politician, member of the Oregon House of Representatives (2001–2009).
John Woodburn, 80, British racing cyclist.

15
David Brumbaugh, 56, American politician, member of the Oklahoma House of Representatives (since 2011).
Johnny Carlyle, 87, Scottish ice hockey player (Nottingham Panthers).
Alberto Carneiro, 79, Portuguese sculptor.
Dorothy Dorow, 86, English soprano.
Amílcar Henríquez, 33, Panamanian footballer (Árabe Unido, national team), shot.
Allan Holdsworth, 70, British guitarist and composer (Bruford, U.K., Soft Machine), heart attack.
Matt Holt, 39, American singer and musician (Nothingface).
Clifton James, 96, American actor (Live and Let Die, Cool Hand Luke, Eight Men Out), complications from diabetes.
Aref Lorestani, 45, Iranian actor, heart attack.
Emma Morano, 117, Italian supercentenarian, verified world's oldest living person, last-known surviving person born in the 1800s.
Sylvia Moy, 78, American songwriter ("Uptight (Everything's Alright)", "I Was Made to Love Her", "My Cherie Amour") and record producer.
Leonard Reiffel, 89, American physicist, inventor of telestrator.
Matt Stephens, 91, Australian politician, member of the Western Australian Legislative Assembly (1971–1989).
Alfonso Yuchengco, 94, Filipino industrialist and diplomat.

16
George Bălăiță, 81, Romanian author.
Michael Bogdanov, 78, British theatre director, heart attack.
Gianni Boncompagni, 84, Italian television and radio presenter (Discoring).
Rosemary Frankau, 84, British actress (Terry and June).
Robert Godwin, 74, American retiree, victim of random killing, shot.
Ed Havrot, 89, Canadian politician.
Satrio Budihardjo Joedono, 84, Indonesian economist, Chairman of the Audit Board (1998–2004).
Spartaco Landini, 73, Italian footballer (Inter Milan, Napoli).
Moses Paukan, 83, American Yup'ik politician, member of the Alaska House of Representatives (1968–1971).

17
Guy Ébrard, 90, French politician.
Vimala Gowda, 63, Indian politician, member of Karnataka Legislative Council (2011–2014).
Claude Frioux, 85, French academic.
Robert B. Hibbs, 84, American Episcopal prelate, Bishop of West Texas.
Dawson Mathis, 76, American politician, member of the U.S. House of Representatives from Georgia's 2nd district (1971–1981).
Joe McCorquodale, 96, American politician, member (1959–1983) and speaker (1971–1983) of the Alabama House of Representatives.
Devineni Nehru, 65, Indian politician, member of Andhra Pradesh Legislative Assembly (1983–1999, 2004–2009), heart attack.
John T. Noonan Jr., 90, American jurist, member of the Court of Appeals for the Ninth Circuit (since 1985).
Michael Perham, 69, British Anglican prelate, Bishop of Gloucester (2004–2014).
Rosey, 47, Samoan-American professional wrestler (WWE, AJPW, FMW), heart failure.
Sean Scanlan, 68, Scottish actor.
Nicolle Van Den Broeck, 70, Belgian racing cyclist, Road Race World Champion (1973).
Trish Vradenburg, 70, American screenwriter (Designing Women, Kate & Allie, Family Ties), heart attack.
Shōichi Watanabe, 86, Japanese scholar and historical revisionist, heart failure.
Othman Wok, 92, Singaporean politician, Minister for Social Affairs (1963–1977).

18
Vic Albury, 69, American baseball player (Minnesota Twins).
Bill Anderson, 80, American football player (Washington Redskins, Green Bay Packers) and broadcaster (Vol Network).
David Ball, 90, American Episcopal prelate, Bishop of Albany (1984–1998).
Amedeo Benedetti, 62, Italian author.
Augustin Bubník, 88, Czech Olympic ice hockey player, silver medallist (1948), coach and politician, MP (1998–2002).
David Chandler, 72, American physical chemist.
Frank Dostal, 71, German music producer and songwriter (Yes Sir, I Can Boogie).
Raymond Han, 85, American painter.
Barkley L. Hendricks, 72, American painter.
Dorrance Hill Hamilton, 88, American philanthropist, heiress of Campbell Soup Company.
Gordon Langford, 86, English composer.
Li Yih-yuan, 85, Taiwanese anthropologist, complications of pneumonia.
Mihalj Mesaroš, 81, Serbian footballer (Partizan, San Diego Toros).
Jean Miot, 77, French journalist.
Ron Moeser, 74, Canadian politician, lymphoma.
Yvonne Monlaur, 77, French actress (Three Strangers in Rome, Circus of Horrors, The Brides of Dracula).
Jaak Panksepp, 73, Estonian-born American neuroscientist, cancer.
Diego Rafecas, 46, Argentine actor and film director.
David H. Rodgers, 93, American politician, Mayor of Spokane, Washington (1967–1978).
J. C. Spink, 45, American producer (A History of Violence, The Hangover, The Butterfly Effect), accidental drug overdose.
Digby Taylor, 75, New Zealand sailor.

19
Jill Amos, 89, New Zealand politician and community leader.
Nikolay Andrushchenko, 73, Russian journalist, injuries sustained in a beating.
Antun Bogetić, 94, Croatian Roman Catholic prelate, Bishop of Poreč-Pula (1984–1997).
Farouk Chanchoun, 61, Iraqi Olympic boxer.
Dick Contino, 87, American accordionist.
Delbert Daisey, 89, American waterfowl decoy maker.
Tom Fleming, 65, American long-distance runner, heart attack.
Phil Gray, 69, Australian politician.
Aaron Hernandez, 27, American football player (New England Patriots) and convicted murderer, suicide by hanging.
Eddie Macon, 90, American football player (Chicago Bears, Oakland Raiders).
Carl Manner, 87, Austrian businessman (Manner confectionery).
Sven Pettersson, 89, Swedish Olympic ski jumper (1956).
Lyda Ann Thomas, 80, American politician, Mayor of Galveston, Texas (2004–2010).
*Yip Kai Foon, 55, Hong Kong gangster, cancer.
Bohdan Zip, 88, Canadian politician, member of the Legislative Assembly of Alberta (1982–1986).

20
Magdalena Abakanowicz, 86, Polish sculptor.
Alexander Bílek, 76, Czech Olympic racewalker.
William F. Clayton, 93, American politician and attorney.
Jay Dickey, 77, American politician, member of the U.S. House of Representatives from Arkansas's 4th congressional district (1993–2001).
David Dougherty, 50, New Zealand man wrongfully convicted of rape and abduction.
Vic Elmes, 69, British musician (Christie).
Sir Ewen Fergusson, 84, British diplomat, Ambassador to South Africa (1982–1984) and France (1987–1992).
Roberto Ferreiro, 81, Argentine footballer (Independiente, River Plate, national team) and manager.
John Freely, 90, American author and physics professor.
Cuba Gooding Sr., 72, American soul singer (The Main Ingredient).
Craufurd Goodwin, 82, Canadian-born American economist and historian.
Paul Hébert, 92, Canadian actor and theatre director.
Jari Helle, 54, Finnish ice hockey player and coach (HC Bolzano).
Lawrence Hogan, 88, American politician, member of the U.S. House of Representatives from Maryland's 5th congressional district (1969–1975).
Sir Geoffrey Holland, 78, British civil servant.
Trustin Howard, 93, American singer, actor and writer (The Joey Bishop Show, This Is Your Life), complications from a fall.
Eric Ingham, 72, British rugby league player.
Jang Deok-jin, 82, South Korean politician, Minister of Agriculture.
Philip Kgosana, 80, South African anti-apartheid activist.
Kojo Laing, 70, Ghanaian novelist.
Ledell Lee, 51, American convicted murderer, execution by lethal injection.
Fernand Leischen, 97, Luxembourgian Olympic fencer (1948, 1952, 1956).
Germaine Mason, 34, Jamaican-born British high jumper, Olympic silver medalist (2008), traffic collision.
John McMillan, 78, Australian footballer (St Kilda).
Sandy McNicol, 72, New Zealand rugby union player (Wanganui, national team).
Marlys Millhiser, 78, American writer.
Skeeter Swift, 70, American basketball player (New Orleans Buccaneers, Pittsburgh Condors, San Antonio Spurs) and coach (Liberty Flames).
Robin Thorne, 87, S. African cricketer.
Anicetus Andrew Wang Chong-yi, 97, Chinese Patriotic Catholic prelate, Archbishop of Guiyang (1988–2014).

21
Lucky Akhand, 60, Bangladeshi singer-composer, lung cancer.
Cecilia Alvear, 77, Ecuadorian-born American journalist (NBC News), breast cancer.
Phillip Ayeni, 68, Nigerian military officer, administrator of Bayelsa State (1996–1997).
Eric Barnard, 92, Australian politician.
Alexei Bolshakov, 77, Russian politician.
Danzel Becker, 69, South African cricketer and umpire.
Carl Christ, 93, American economist.
Cape Cross, 23, Irish-bred racehorse and sire, euthanized.
Ugo Ehiogu, 44, English football player (Aston Villa, Middlesbrough, national team) and coach, heart attack.
Maria Zhorella Fedorova, 101, Austrian-born American opera singer and teacher.
Wolfgang Fürniß, 72, German politician.
Sandy Gallin, 76, American talent agent (Michael Jackson) and producer (Buffy the Vampire Slayer, Father of the Bride), multiple myeloma.
John Grinold, 81, American college athletic director (Northeastern University).
Kristine Jepson, 54, American mezzo-soprano, cancer.
Gerry Jones, 84, Australian politician.
Sean McEniff, 81, Irish politician and businessman.
Enrico Medioli, 92, Italian screenwriter (Once Upon a Time in America, The Damned, The Leopard).
Onuora Nzekwu, 89, Nigerian writer.
Stathis Psaltis, 66, Greek comedian, lung cancer.
Robert H. Shaffer, 101, American academic.
Jetsun Lobsang Tenzin, 80, Tibetan Lama, 103rd Ganden Tripa.

22
Miguel Abensour, 78, French philosopher.
Hector Acebes, 96, American photographer.
Jeff Butler, 83, English football manager (Kaizer Chiefs, South Africa national team).
Hubert Dreyfus, 87, American philosopher, cancer.
Henning Eichberg, 74, German sociologist.
Bjarte Eikeset, 80, Norwegian lawyer, judge and politician, traffic collision.
Olga Hegedus, 96, British cellist.
Götz Heidelberg, 94, German engineer.
William Hjortsberg, 76, American novelist and screenwriter (Legend, Falling Angel), pancreatic cancer.
Vladimir Kamirski, 74, Polish-Australian conductor.
Jess Kersey, 76, American basketball official (ABA, NBA), cancer.
Ian Kirkwood, Lord Kirkwood, 84, Scottish jurist, Senator of the College of Justice.
Alvin H. Kukuk, 79, American politician.
*Lee Chi-chun, 74, Taiwanese radio presenter.
Sophie Lefranc-Duvillard, 46, French Olympic alpine skier (1992, 1994, 1998).
Cleber Leite, 47, Brazilian Olympic rower.
Erin Moran, 56, American actress (Happy Days, Joanie Loves Chachi, Galaxy of Terror), tonsil cancer.
Peter Moss, 78, British colonial administrator, park ranger, and pioneer of eco-tourism.
Hiroshi Nakai, 74, Japanese politician, stomach cancer.
Attilio Nicora, 80, Italian Roman Catholic cardinal, Bishop of Verona (1992–1997), President of Patrimony of the Apostolic See (2002–2011).
Sir Julian Priestley, 66, British civil servant, Secretary General of the European Parliament (1997–2007), cancer.
Witold Pyrkosz, 90, Polish actor (M jak miłość, Janosik, Czterej pancerni i pies).
Gustavo Rojo, 93, Uruguayan actor (Tarzan and the Mermaids, The Evil Forest, The Valley of Gwangi).
Hans-Heinrich Sander, 72, German politician.
Michele Scarponi, 37, Italian racing cyclist, 2011 Giro d'Italia winner, traffic collision.
Pere Tàpias, 70, Spanish food writer and radio presenter.
Peter Wells, 80, British medical physicist.

23
Isiaka Adeleke, 62, Nigerian politician, Governor of Osun State (1992–1993), heart attack.
Jerry Adriani, 70, Brazilian singer and actor, cancer.
Inga Ålenius, 78, Swedish actress (Hem till byn, Fanny and Alexander, In Bed with Santa).
Leo Baxendale, 86, British comics artist (The Bash Street Kids, Minnie the Minx, Little Plum).
Chris Bearde, 80, Australian comedy writer and producer (Rowan & Martin's Laugh-In, The Sonny & Cher Comedy Hour, The Gong Show), heart attack.
Jaynne Bittner, 91, American baseball player (Grand Rapids Chicks, Fort Wayne Daisies).
Anne Pippin Burnett, 91, American classics scholar.
Henry Chung, 98, Chinese-American diplomat.
Kathleen Crowley, 87, American actress (Robert Montgomery Presents, Maverick, Downhill Racer).
Ana Delfosse, 85, Chilean-born American race-car driver and mechanic.
Mickey Dewar, 61, Australian historian, motor neuron disease.
Imre Földi, 78, Hungarian weightlifter, Olympic champion (1972).
Charles Foster, 94, English-born Canadian writer and publicist.
Noritoshi Kanai, 94, Japanese-born American executive.
Adalbert Korponai, 51, Ukrainian footballer (Kremin Kremenchuk, Metalist Kharkiv), colon cancer.
Kate O'Beirne, 67, American political columnist, editor (National Review), and commentator (Capital Gang), lung cancer.
Eva Picardi, 69, Italian philosopher.
František Rajtoral, 31, Czech footballer (Baník Ostrava, Viktoria Plzeň, national team), suicide by hanging.
Luis Pércovich Roca, 85, Peruvian politician, Prime Minister (1984–1985).
Johnny Roe, 79, Irish jockey.
Ken Sears, 83, American basketball player (New York Knicks, San Francisco Warriors).
Erdoğan Teziç, 81, Turkish academic.
Chriet Titulaer, 73, Dutch astronomer, television presenter, and science and technology writer.
Michael Williams, Baron Williams of Baglan, 67, British peer and diplomat, pancreatic cancer.

24
Glory Annen, 64, Canadian actress (Felicity).
Benjamin Barber, 77, American political theorist and author (Jihad vs. McWorld), pancreatic cancer.
František Brůna, 72, Czech handball player (national team), Olympic silver medalist (1972).
Xavier Corberó, 81, Spanish sculptor.
Agustín Edwards Eastman, 89, French-born Chilean newspaper publisher, owner of El Mercurio.
Phil Edwards, 67, British Olympic racing cyclist (1972).
Agnes Giebel, 95, German soprano.
Don Gordon, 90, American actor (Bullitt, Papillon, The Towering Inferno).
Jack Harold Jones, 52, American serial killer, execution by lethal injection.
Dagmar Lerchová, 86, Czech Olympic figure skater (1948).
Michael Mantenuto, 35, American actor (Miracle) and military officer, suicide by gunshot.
Robert M. Pirsig, 88, American writer and philosopher (Zen and the Art of Motorcycle Maintenance).
Osmund Reynolds, 84, British paediatrician.
Bradley Sack, 81, American researcher, aneurysm.
Nicholas Sand, 75, American chemist, heart attack.
Evangelina Villegas, 92, Mexican biochemist.

25
Adolf Bachura, 84, Austrian Olympic ice hockey player (1964).
Calep Emphrey Jr., 67, American drummer (B.B. King).
Rolf Fjeldvær, 91, Norwegian politician, MP (1965–1981).
Hsieh Chin-ting, 81, Taiwanese politician, Miaoli County Magistrate (1981–1989).
Chris Gollon, 64, British painter.
Amol Jichkar, 38, Indian cricketer.
Sasha Lakovic, 45, Canadian ice hockey player (New Jersey Devils), brain cancer.
Erik Martin, 81, German songwriter and editor (Muschelhaufen).
Philippe Mestre, 89, French media executive and politician, member of the National Assembly (1981–1993), Minister of Veteran Affairs and War Victims (1993–1995).
Elena Rzhevskaya, 97, Belarusian-born Russian writer.
Issa Samb, 71, Senegalese artist.
Munyua Waiyaki, 90, Kenyan politician, Minister for Foreign Affairs (1974–1979).

26
Moïse Brou Apanga, 35, Ivorian-born Gabonese footballer, heart attack.
Raj Bagri, Baron Bagri, 86, Indian-born British businessman (London Metal Exchange).
Prince Bartholomew, 77, Trinidadian cricketer (national team).
Babalola Borishade, 71, Nigerian politician, lung and heart disease.
Jonathan Demme, 73, American film director (The Silence of the Lambs, Philadelphia, Rachel Getting Married), Oscar winner (1992), complications from esophageal cancer and heart disease.
Charles Eugster, 97, British Masters athlete.
Tom Forkner, 98, American businessman and lawyer, co-founder of Waffle House.
Andrew G. Frommelt, 95, American politician.
James Knoll Gardner, 76, American jurist, U.S. District Court for the Eastern District of Pennsylvania (since 2002).
Robert Hilder, 67, American jurist, esophageal cancer.
Chet Kalm, 91, American artist, pneumonia.
Dennis Karjala, 77, American law professor.
William L. Kirk, 84, American air force general.
Daniel Francis Merriam, 90, American geologist.
Bill Page, 91, American reed player and band leader.
Margit Pörtner, 45, Danish curler, European champion (1994), Olympic silver medalist (1998).
Harold Van Heuvelen, 98, American composer and teacher.
Andreas von der Meden, 74, German actor, voice actor and musician.
Peter Venables, 94, British psychologist.
Ronald Karslake Starr Wood, 98, British plant pathologist.

27
Vito Acconci, 77, American artist and architectural designer, stroke.
Amberleigh House, 25, Irish racehorse, winner of 2004 Grand National, complications from colic.
Nikolai Arefyev, 37, Russian footballer.
Eduard Brunner, 77, Swiss clarinetist.
Vinu Chakravarthy, 71, Indian actor.
Chen Tingru, 103, Chinese WWII army officer.
Luis Dogliotti, 79, Uruguayan footballer.
Jan Flinik, 84, Polish Olympic field hockey player (1952, 1960).
Peter George, 75, Canadian economist, President of McMaster University (1995–2010).
Vitaliy Kalynychenko, 79, Soviet-born American human rights activist (Ukrainian Helsinki Group).
Vinod Khanna, 70, Indian actor (Mere Apne, Amar Akbar Anthony, Suryaa: An Awakening) and politician, member of the Lok Sabha for Gurdaspur (1997–2009; since 2014), bladder cancer.
Joe Leonard, 84, American motorcycle racer and racecar driver.
*Lin Yi-han, 26, Taiwanese novelist, suicide by hanging.
Robin Millhouse, 87, Australian judge and politician.
Alexia Pickering, 86, New Zealand disabilities rights campaigner.
Sadanoyama Shinmatsu, 79, Japanese sumo wrestler, pneumonia.
Peter Spier, 89, Dutch-born American illustrator and children's writer.
Kenneth Williams, 38, American serial killer, execution by lethal injection.
Julius Youngner, 96, American virologist.

28
Lothar Beckert, 85, German Olympic long-distance runner (1956, 1960).
*Brazo de Oro, 57, Mexican professional wrestler (CMLL, UWA, NWA), heart attack.
Joanna Brouk, 68, American electronic musician and composer.
Ken Breitenbach, 62, Canadian ice hockey player (Buffalo Sabres), cancer.
Ion Degen, 91, Ukrainian-born Israeli writer, doctor and medical scientist.
Mariano Gagnon, 87, American missionary.
Richard Haynes, 90, American lawyer.
Danny Killeen, 84, American Olympic sailor.
Janelle Kirtley, 73, American water skier, world champion (1961).
Maurice Lauze, 94, French racing cyclist (1948 Tour de France).
Edouard Mathos, 68, Central African Roman Catholic prelate, Bishop of Bambari (since 2004).
Luis Olmo, 97, Puerto Rican baseball player (Brooklyn Dodgers), double pneumonia and complications from Alzheimer's disease.
Billy Scott, 68, American race car driver.
John Shifflett, 64, American jazz musician, pancreatic cancer.
Donie Shine, 65, Irish football player (Clann na nGael, Roscommon) and manager.
Patrick Thaddeus, 84, American astronomer.
Francis Travis, 95, American-born Swiss orchestral conductor.
Andrew Tyler, 70, British animal rights campaigner and music journalist.
Sir John Whitmore, 79, British racing driver and executive coach.

29
Diego Natale Bona, 90, Italian Roman Catholic prelate, Bishop of Porto e Santa Rufina (1985–1994) and Saluzzo (1994–2003).
Sonika Chauhan, 27, Indian actress and model, car crash.
Jonathan Dele, 70, Nigerian Olympic boxer (1968).
Jordan Edwards, 15, American victim of police shooting, shot.
George Genyk, 78, American college football player (University of Michigan) and coach, cancer.
Vehid Gunić, 76, Bosnian journalist.
William M. Hoffman, 78, American playwright (As Is).
Saeed Karimian, 45, Iranian media activist, director-general of GEM TV, shot.
Ernie Kell, 88, American politician, Mayor of Long Beach (1984–1994), cancer.
Herbert Nkabiti, 36, Botswanan welterweight boxer, head injuries sustained in a fight.
Lidia Pitteri, 83, Italian Olympic gymnast (1952).
R. Vidyasagar Rao, 77, Indian irrigation engineer, bladder cancer.
Mátyás Usztics, 68, Hungarian actor.
Edward D. White Jr., 92, American architect.

30
Leone Bagnall, 83, Canadian politician.
Belchior, 70, Brazilian singer and composer.
Clifford Brewer, 104, British surgeon.
Anna Lee Carroll, 86, American actress (Not of This Earth, The Heart Is a Lonely Hunter, Marlowe).
Mbah Gotho, 146 (claimed), Indonesian longevity claimant, oldest unverified living person, heart failure.
Lorna Gray, 99, American actress (O, My Darling Clementine, Captain America, Oh! Susanna).
Howard Hart, 76, American CIA officer.
Esad Hećimović, 53, Bosnian investigative journalist.
Preston Henn, 86, American entrepreneur (Fort Lauderdale Swap Shop) and racing driver.
Jayson Hinder, 51, Australian politician, member of the Australian Capital Territory Legislative Assembly (2016), traffic collision.
Jack Imel, 84, American entertainer.
Jidéhem, 81, Belgian comics artist (Sophie).
Archduke Joseph Árpád of Austria, 84, Austro-Hungarian royal, Captain General of the Order of Vitéz (since 1977).
Ray Kogovsek, 75, American politician, member of the Colorado Senate (1970–1978) and the U.S. House of Representatives from Colorado's 3rd congressional district (1979–1985).
Borys Oliynyk, 81, Ukrainian author, poet, translator and politician, member of Verkhovna Rada (1992–2006).
Anders Omholt, 90, Norwegian physicist.
Tam Spiva, 84, American television writer (The Brady Bunch).
Ueli Steck, 40, Swiss rock climber and mountaineer, climbing fall.
Jean Stein, 83, American author and editor (The Paris Review), suicide by jumping.

References

2017-04
 04